William Ian McKenzie (born March 12, 1949) is a Canadian former professional ice hockey goaltender who played for the Detroit Red Wings, Kansas City Scouts, and Colorado Rockies in the National Hockey League (NHL) between 1973 and 1980. He also played in various minor leagues, primarily the American Hockey League and Central Hockey League.

Early life 
McKenzie was born in St. Thomas, Ontario, but his family later moved to Riverside, Ontario. He attended Riverside Secondary School from 1964 to 1968, where he competed in football, track, and hockey.

Career 
Prior to turning professional, McKenzie played for Ohio State University (1968–72), where he helped the team win the inaugural CCHA Tournament Championship in 1972. He was later inducted into the Ohio State University Sports Hall of Fame. Upon retirement from professional hockey, he worked in sales, but continued his involvement with the sport as a volunteer assistant coach for the Ohio State Buckeyes men's ice hockey from 1980 through their first appearance in the NCAA Frozen Four in 1998. He then became a volunteer assistant for the Ohio State Women's hockey team from 2004 to 2010.

Career statistics

Regular season and playoffs

Awards and honours

References

External links

For a more comprehensive summary of McKenzie's professional career please see the article "Forgotten NHL Goalies: Bill McKenzie" by Nathaniel Oliver.

1949 births
Canadian ice hockey goaltenders
Colorado Rockies (NHL) players
Detroit Red Wings players
Fort Worth Texans players
Hampton Gulls (AHL) players
Ice hockey people from Ontario
Kansas City Blues players
Kansas City Scouts players
Living people
Ohio State Buckeyes men's ice hockey players
Oklahoma City Blazers (1965–1977) players
People from St. Thomas, Ontario
Philadelphia Firebirds (AHL) players
Port Huron Wings players
Rhode Island Reds players
Tulsa Oilers (1964–1984) players
Undrafted National Hockey League players
Virginia Wings players
London Lions (ice hockey) players
Canadian expatriate ice hockey players in England
Canadian expatriate ice hockey players in the United States